Antrim may refer to:

Boats
Antrim 20, an American sailboat design

People 
 Donald Antrim (born 1958), American writer
 "Henry Antrim", an alias used by Henry McCarty, better known as Billy the Kid, a 19th-century outlaw
 Harry Antrim (1884–1967) vaudeville, film and television actor (sometimes billed as "Henry Antrim")
 Minna Antrim (1861–1950), American writer
 Richard Antrim (1907–1969), a rear admiral in the United States Navy

Places

Canada
 Antrim, Nova Scotia
 Antrim, Ontario, now part of the city of Ottawa

Northern Ireland 
 County Antrim, one of the counties of Northern Ireland
 Antrim, County Antrim, the town
 Antrim railway station, serving the town of Antrim
 Antrim (borough), an administrative division
 Antrim GAA, the Gaelic football, hurling or any other sporting teams fielded by the Antrim County Board of the Gaelic Athletic Association
 Antrim county football team
 Former constituencies:
 Antrim (UK Parliament constituency) 
 Antrim County (Parliament of Ireland constituency)
 Antrim (Northern Ireland Parliament constituency)
 Antrim Borough (Parliament of Ireland constituency)
 Antrim Borough (Northern Ireland Parliament constituency)

United States
Antrim (Taneytown, Maryland), listed on the NRHP in Maryland
Antrim, Michigan
Antrim, New Hampshire, a New England town
Antrim (CDP), New Hampshire, the main village in the town
Antrim, New York, a hamlet in Ramapo, New York
Antrim, Ohio, a hamlet in Madison Township, Guernsey County
Antrim, Pennsylvania, in Tioga County
Antrim, Texas, a ghost town also known as Pleasant Hill
Antrim County, Michigan
Antrim Township, Michigan
Antrim Township, Watonwan County, Minnesota
Antrim Township, Franklin County, Pennsylvania
Antrim Township, Wyandot County, Ohio

Ships 
 USS Antrim (FFG-20), named after Richard Antrim
 HMS Antrim, two ships of the Royal Navy, named after County Antrim

Other 
 Battle of Antrim, during the Irish Rebellion of 1798